The Sonic Mook Experiment is a music enterprise overseen by Sean McLusky which encompasses a club night and several albums.

The club claims that "like many great clubs in that it was about good music, drugs, scoop live performances, attractive fashionable people and quirky fad-inspiring outfits". 

The first Sonic Mook Experiment was held at a venue called The Wheel in Holborn in early 1997, taking place alongside Heavenly Records' Social.  The emphasis was very much on eclecticism, with Sigue Sigue Sputnik playing against a backdrop of guitar, beats and hip hop music.  The club's move to 333 in Shoreditch saw live bands like Clinic, Asian Dub Foundation and Suicide play, as well as boundary-breaking underground electronic music, such as J Saul Kane, Jerry Dammers and Andrew Weatherall.  The club segued from the collision of electronic and indie in the late 90s into the more pronounced rock and roll of 2001 onwards.

In early 2002, Sonic Mook Relocated to the 93 Feet East club on Brick Lane in the East End of London. There it produced exclusive first live performances in London from bands like the New York City punk-funk outfit The Rapture.

In June 2002, it staged an event at the Institute of Contemporary Arts on The Mall in London, during the Queen's Golden Jubilee.  The event, held over four days, launched the second CD in the Future Rock & Roll series.  The new album featured 25 tracks from some of the hottest new bands around, many for the first time on CD. Capturing the energy and attitude of the club night that spawned it and the nascent rock and roll scene in London and New York, it included tracks from The Eighties Matchbox B-Line Disaster, The Liars, The Martini Henry Rifles,  Yeah Yeah Yeahs, Some Product by Anne McCloy, Fat Truckers, and The Buff Medways. Several disturbances during the festival saw armed police escorting attendees away during the high security Jubilee celebrations nearby.

After a hiatus, aside from occasional get-togethers, the night returned to 333, more recently the Dogstar in Brixton.

External links
Official site (now offline)

Music events in the United Kingdom